Charles Allison may refer to:

 Charles Allison (cricketer) (1885–1968), South African cricketer
 Charles Allison (mayor) (1845–1920), 28th Mayor of Christchurch
 Charles Frederick Allison (1885–1955), Canadian merchant, philanthropist and founder of Mount Allison University
 Charles Gary Allison (1938–2008), American screenwriter and film producer